José Daniel Ortega Saavedra (born 11 November 1945) is a Nicaraguan revolutionary and politician serving as President of Nicaragua since 2007. Previously he was leader of Nicaragua from 1979 to 1990, first as coordinator of the Junta of National Reconstruction (1979–1985) and then as President of Nicaragua (1985–1990).

In the 1984 Nicaraguan general election, Ortega won Nicaragua's presidential election as the FSLN's candidate. A Marxist–Leninist, Ortega pursued a program of nationalization, land reform, wealth redistribution, and the Nicaraguan Literacy Campaign during his first period in office. A leader in the Sandinista National Liberation Front (FSLN), he implemented policies to achieve leftist reforms across Nicaragua. In later years, Ortega's left-wing radical politics cooled significantly, leading him to pursue pro-business policies and even rapprochement with the Catholic Church. 

This was followed in the 2000s by his government's endorsement of strong anti-abortion policies. Ortega's rhetoric took on a new, strongly religious tenor, although he had formerly claimed to be an atheist. 

After a difficult presidency marred by war and economic collapse, Ortega was defeated in the 1990 Nicaraguan general election by Violeta Chamorro. He continued to be an important figure in Nicaraguan opposition politics. 

Ortega was an unsuccessful candidate for president in 1996 and 2001 but won the 2006 Nicaraguan general election. In office, he made alliances with fellow Latin American socialists, such as Venezuelan President Hugo Chávez. 

Under Ortega's leadership, Nicaragua joined the Bolivarian Alliance for the Americas. His second administration became increasingly anti-democratic, alienating many of his former revolutionary allies, some of whom compared him to Somoza, whom they had overthrown. In June 2018, Amnesty International and the Inter-American Commission on Human Rights of the Organization of American States reported that Ortega had engaged in a violent oppression campaign against protesters in response to the anti-Ortega 2018–2022 Nicaraguan protests. The violent crackdown during 2018 protests and subsequent constriction of civil liberties have led to massive waves of emigration to neighboring Costa Rica, with more than 30,000 Nicaraguans filing for asylum in that country. 

The repression intensified in his fourth term, when he ordered the closure of several NGOs, universities, and newspapers.

Repression against his political opponents increased in 2021. His government jailed many potential rival candidates in the 2021 Nicaraguan general election, including Cristiana Chamorro Barrios, daughter of former president Violeta Chamorro. Ortega's government also imprisoned other opponents, such as former allies Dora Maria Tellez and Hugo Torres Jiménez. In August 2021, Nicaragua cancelled the operating permits of six US and European NGOs. Many critics of the Ortega government, including opposition leaders, journalists and members of civil society, fled the country in mid-2021. After Ortega was re-elected in 2021, President Joe Biden banned him and his officials from entering the United States because of their political repression.

Early life

Early childhood
Ortega was born in La Libertad, department of Chontales, Nicaragua, into a working-class family. His parents, Daniel Ortega Cerda and Lidia Saavedra, were opposed to the regime of Anastasio Somoza Debayle. His mother was imprisoned by Somoza's National Guard for being in possession of "love letters," which the police said were coded political missives. Ortega and his two brothers grew up to become revolutionaries. His brother Humberto Ortega is a former general, military leader, and published writer, and the third brother Camilo Ortega died fighting the Somoza regime in 1978. They had a sister, Germania, who died.

Juigalpa and Managua
Seeking stable employment, the family migrated from La Libertad to the provincial capital of Juigalpa, and then to a middle-class neighborhood in Managua. In Managua, Ortega and his brother studied at the upper-middle class high school, the LaSalle Institute, where Ortega was classmates with Arnoldo Aleman, who would go on to be mayor of Managua (1990-1995) and later President of Nicaragua (1997-2002). Ortega's father Daniel Ortega Cedra detested US military intervention in Nicaragua and Washington's support for the Somoza government. He imparted this anti-American sentiment to his sons.

Early political activity
From an early age Ortega opposed Nicaragua's president Anastasio Somoza Debayle, and became involved in the underground movement against his government. Ortega and his brother Humberto formed the Insurrectionist, or Tercerista (Third Way) faction, culminating in the Nicaraguan Revolution. After the overthrow and exile of Somoza Debayle's government, Ortega became leader of the ruling multi-partisan Junta of National Reconstruction.

Ortega was first arrested for political activities at the age of 15, and quickly joined the then-underground Sandinista National Liberation Front (FSLN) in 1963. In 1964, Ortega travelled to Guatemala, where the police arrested him and turned him over to the Nicaraguan National Guard. After his release from detainment, Ortega arranged the assassination of his torturer, Guardsman Gonzalo Lacayo, in August 1967.

Imprisonment
He was imprisoned in 1967 for taking part in armed robbery of a branch of the Bank of America. He told collaborators that they should be killed if they did not take part in the robbery. Ortega was released in late 1974, along with other Sandinista prisoners, in exchange for Somocista hostages. While imprisoned at the El Modelo jail, just outside Managua, Ortega wrote poems, one of which he titled "I Never Saw Managua When Miniskirts Were in Fashion". During his imprisonment, Ortega was tortured. While he was incarcerated at El Modelo, his mother helped stage protests and hunger strikes for political prisoners; this resulted in improving the treatment of incarcerated Sandinistas.

Exile in Cuba
Upon release in 1974, Ortega was exiled to Cuba. There he received training in guerrilla warfare from Fidel Castro's Marxist–Leninist government. He later returned secretly to Nicaragua.

Sectional division within the FSLN
In the late 1970s, divisions over the FSLN's campaign against Somoza led Ortega and his brother Humberto to form the Insurrectionist, or Tercerista (Third Way) faction. The Terceristas sought to combine the distinct guerrilla war strategies of the two other factions, Tomás Borge's Guerra Prolongada Popular (GPP, or Prolonged People's War), and Jaime Wheelock's Proletarian Tendency. The Ortega brothers forged alliances with a wide array of anti-Somoza forces, including Catholic and Protestant activists, and other non-Marxist civil society groups. The Terceristas became the most effective faction in wielding political and military strength, and their push for FSLN solidarity received the support of revolutionary leaders such as Fidel Castro.

Marriage and family
Ortega married Rosario Murillo in 1979 in a secret ceremony. They moved to Costa Rica with her three children from a previous marriage. Ortega remarried Murillo in 2005 in order to have the marriage recognized by the Catholic Church, as part of his effort to reconcile with the church. The couple has eight children, three of them together. Murillo serves as the Ortega government's spokeswoman and a government minister, among other positions. Ortega adopted stepdaughter Zoilamérica Narváez in 1986, through a court case.

Sandinista revolution (1979–1990)

When Somoza was overthrown by the FSLN in July 1979, Ortega became a member of the five-person Junta of National Reconstruction, which included Sandinista militant Moisés Hassan, novelist Sergio Ramírez, businessman Alfonso Robelo, and Violeta Barrios de Chamorro, the widow of a murdered journalist. In September 1979, United States President Carter hosted Ortega at the White House, and warned him against arming other Central American leftist guerrilla movements. At the time, Ortega spoke truthfully when he denied Sandinista involvement in neighboring countries. When Ortega questioned the Americans about CIA support for anti-Sandinista groups, Carter and Deputy Secretary of State Warren Christopher said the reports were false. After the meeting, Carter asked Congress for $75 million in aid to Nicaragua, contingent on the Sandinista government's promise not to aid other guerrillas.

The FSLN came to dominate the junta, Robelo and Chamorro resigned, and in 1981 Ortega became the coordinator of the Junta. As the only member of the FSLN National Directorate in the Junta, he was the effective leader of the country. After attaining power, the FSLN embarked upon an ambitious programme of social reform. They arranged to redistribute  of land to about 100,000 families; launched a literacy drive, and made health care improvements that ended polio through mass vaccinations, and reduced the frequency of other treatable diseases. The Sandinista nationalization efforts affected mostly banks and industries owned by the extended Somoza family. More than half of all farms, businesses, and industries remained in private hands. The revolutionary government wanted to preserve a mixed economy and support private sector investment. The Superior Council of Private Enterprise (COSEP) opposed the Sandinistas’ economic reform. The main organization of Nicaraguan big business was composed of prosperous families from the Pacific coast cities, who dominated commerce and banking. Ortega took a very hard line against opposition to his policies: On 21 February 1981, the Sandinista army killed 7 Miskito Indians and wounded 17.

Ortega's administration forced displacement of many of the indigenous population: 10,000 individuals had been moved by 1982. Thousands of Indians fled to take refuge across the border in Honduras, and Ortega's government imprisoned 14,000 in Nicaragua. Anthropologist Gilles Bataillon termed this "politics of ethnocide" in Nicaragua. The Indians formed two rebel groups – the Misura and Misurasata. They were joined in the north by Nicaraguan Democratic Force (FDN) and in the south by former Sandinistas and peasantry who, under the leadership of Edén Pastora, were resisting forced collectivization.

In 1980 the Sandinista government launched the massive Nicaraguan Literacy Campaign and said the illiteracy rate fell from 50% to 13% in the span of five months. Robert F. Arnove said the figures were excessive because many "unteachable" illiterates were omitted from the statistics, and many people declared literate were found to be unable to read or write a simple sentence. Richard Kraft said that even if the figures were exaggerated, the "accomplishment is without precedent in educational history". In 1980, UNESCO awarded Nicaragua the Nadezhda K. Krupskaya prize in recognition of its efforts. The FSLN also focused on improving the Nicaraguan health system, particularly through vaccination campaigns and the construction of public hospitals. These actions reduced child mortality by half, to 40 deaths per thousand. By 1982, the World Health Organization deemed Nicaragua a model for primary health care. During this period, Nicaragua won the UNESCO prize for exceptional health progress.

In 1981, United States President Ronald Reagan accused the FSLN of joining with Soviet-backed Cuba in supporting Marxist revolutionary movements in other Latin American countries, such as El Salvador. People within the Reagan administration authorized the CIA to begin financing, arming and training rebels as anti-Sandinista guerrillas, some of whom were former officers from Somoza's National Guard. These were known collectively as the Contras. This resulted in one of the largest political scandals in US history, (the Iran–Contra affair). Oliver North and several members of the Reagan administration defied the Boland Amendment, selling arms to Iran and using the proceeds in order to secretly fund the Contras.

The Contra war claimed 30,000 lives in Nicaragua. The tactics used by the Sandinista government to fight the Contras have been widely condemned for their suppression of civil rights. On 15 March 1982, the Junta declared a state of siege, which allowed it to close independent radio stations, suspend the right of association, and limit the freedom of trade unions. Nicaragua's Permanent Commission on Human Rights condemned Sandinista human rights violations, accusing them of killing and forcibly disappearing thousands of persons in the first few years of the war.

At the 1984 general election Ortega won the presidency with 67% of the vote and took office on 10 January 1985. In the early phases of the campaign, Ortega enjoyed many institutional advantages, and used the full power of the press, police, and Supreme Electoral Council against the fractured opposition. In the weeks before the November election, Ortega gave a U.N. speech denouncing talks held in Rio de Janeiro on electoral reform. But by 22 October, the Sandinistas signed an accord with opposition parties to reform electoral and campaign laws, making the process more fair and transparent. While campaigning, Ortega promoted the Sandinistas’ achievements, and at a rally said that “Democracy is literacy, democracy is land reform, democracy is education and public health.” International observers judged the election to be the first free election held in the country in more than half a century. A report by an Irish governmentary delegation stated: "The electoral process was carried out with total integrity. The seven parties participating in the elections represented a broad spectrum of political ideologies." The general counsel of New York's Human Rights Commission described the election as "free, fair and hotly contested." A study by the US Latin American Studies Association (LASA) concluded that the FSLN (Sandinista Front) "did little more to take advantage of its incumbency than incumbent parties everywhere (including the U.S.) routinely do." However some people described the election as "rigged". According to a detailed study, since the 1984 election was for posts subordinate to the Sandinista Directorate, the elections were no more subject to approval by vote than the Central Committee of the Communist Party is in countries of the East Bloc.

Thirty-three per cent of the Nicaraguan voters cast ballots for one of six opposition parties—three to the right of the Sandinistas, three to the left—which had campaigned with the aid of government funds and free T.V. and radio time. Two conservative parties captured a combined 23% of the vote. They held rallies across the country (a few of which were disrupted by FSLN supporters) and blasted the Sandinistas in harsh terms. Most foreign and independent observers noted this pluralism in debunking the Reagan administration charge—ubiquitous in the US media—that it was a "Soviet-style sham" election. Some opposition parties boycotted the election, allegedly under pressure from US embassy officials, and so it was denounced as being unfair by the Reagan administration. Reagan thus maintained that he was justified to continue supporting what he referred to as the Contras' "democratic resistance".

The illegal intervention of the Contras continued (albeit covertly) after Ortega's democratic election. Peace talks between five Central American heads of state in July 1987 led to the signing of the Central American Peace Accords, and the beginning of a roadmap to the end of the conflict. In 1988, the Contras first entered into peace talks with the Sandinista government, although the violence continued, as did their US support. Despite US opposition, disarmament of the Contras began in 1989.

In opposition (1990–2007)
In the 1990 presidential election, Ortega lost his reelection bid to Violeta Barrios de Chamorro, his former colleague in the junta. Chamorro was supported by the US and a 14-party anti-Sandinista alliance known as the National Opposition Union (Unión Nacional Oppositora, UNO), an alliance that ranged from conservatives and liberals to communists. She ran an effective campaign, presenting herself as the peace candidate and promising to end the US-funded Contra War if she won. Ortega campaigned on the slogan, "Everything Will Be Better," and promised that, with the Contra war over, he could focus on the nation's recovery. Contrary to what most observers expected, Chamorro shocked Ortega and won the election. Chamorro's UNO coalition garnered 54% of the vote, and won 51 of the 92 seats in the National Assembly. Immediately after the loss, the Sandinistas tried to maintain unity around their revolutionary posture. In Ortega's concession speech the following day he vowed to keep "ruling from below" a reference to the power that the FSLN still wielded in various sectors. He also stressed his belief that the Sandinistas had the goal of bringing "dignity" to Latin America, and not necessarily to hold on to government posts. In 1991, Ortega said elections were “an instrument to reaffirm” the FSLN's “political and ideological positions,” and also “confront capitalism.” However, the electoral loss led to pronounced divisions in the FSLN. Some members adopted more pragmatic positions, and sought to transform the FSLN into a modern social democratic party engaged in national reconciliation and class cooperation. Ortega and other party insiders found common ground with the radicals, who still promoted anti-imperialism and class conflict to achieve social change.

Possible explanations for his loss include that the Nicaraguan people were disenchanted with the Ortega government as well as the fact that already in November 1989, the White House had announced that the economic embargo against Nicaragua would continue unless Violeta Chamorro won. Also, there had been reports of intimidation from the side of the contras, with a Canadian observer mission stating that 42 people were killed by the contras in "election violence" in October 1989. This led many commentators to assume that Nicaraguans voted against the Sandinistas out of fear of a continuation of the contra war and economic deprivation.

From 19 to 21 July 1991, the FSLN held a National Congress to mend the rifts between members and form a new overarching political program. The effort failed to unite the party, and intense debates over the internal governance of the FSLN continued. The pragmatists, led by the former vice president Sergio Ramirez, formed the basis of a "renovating" faction, and supported collaboration with other political forces to preserve the rule of law in Nicaragua. Under the leadership of Ortega and Tomas Borge, the radicals regrouped into the "principled" faction, and branded themselves the Izquierda Democratica (ID), or Democratic Left (DL). The DL fought the Chamorro government with disruptive labor strikes and demonstrations, and renewed calls for the revolutionary reconstruction of Nicaraguan society. During the 20–23 May 1994, extraordinary congress, Ortega ran against a fellow National Directorate member, Henry Ruiz, for the position of party secretary-general. Ortega was elected with 287 to Ruiz's 147 votes, and the DL secured the most dominant role in the FSLN.

On 9 September 1994, Ortega gained more power after taking over Sergio Ramirez's seat in the Asamblea Sandinista (Sandinista Assembly). Ramirez had served as chief of the FSLN's parliamentary caucus since 1990, but Ortega came to oppose his actions in the National Assembly, setting the stage for Ramirez's removal. Historic leaders, such as Ernesto Cardenal, a former minister of culture in the Sandinista government, rejected Ortega's consolidation of power: “My resignation from the FSLN has been caused by the kidnapping of the party carried out by Daniel Ortega and the group he heads.” The party formally split on 8 January 1995, when Ramirez and a number of prominent Sandinista officials quit.

Ortega ran for election again, in October 1996 and November 2001, but lost on both occasions to Arnoldo Alemán and Enrique Bolaños, respectively. In these elections, a key issue was the allegation of corruption. In Ortega's last days as president, through a series of legislative acts known as "The Piñata", estates that had been seized by the Sandinista government (some valued at millions and even billions of US dollars) became the private property of various FSLN officials, including Ortega himself.

In the 1996 campaign, Ortega faced the Liberal Alliance (Alianza Liberal), headed by Arnoldo Aleman Lacayo, a former mayor of Managua. The Sandinistas softened their anti-imperialist rhetoric, with Ortega calling the US “our great neighbor,” and vowing to cooperate “within a framework of respect, equality, and justice.” The image change failed, as Aleman's Liberal Alliance came first with 51.03% of the vote, while Ortega's FSLN secured 37.75%.

Ortega's policies became more moderate during his time in opposition, and he gradually changed much of his former Marxist stance in favor of an agenda of democratic socialism. His Roman Catholic faith has become more public in recent years as well, leading Ortega to embrace a variety of socially conservative policies; in 2006 the FSLN endorsed a strict law banning all abortions in Nicaragua. In the run-up to the 2006 elections, Ortega displayed his ties to the Catholic Church by renewing his marriage vows before Cardinal Miguel Obando y Bravo.

Ortega was instrumental in creating the controversial strategic pact between the FSLN and the Constitutional Liberal Party (Partido Liberal Constitucionalista, PLC). The controversial alliance of Nicaragua's two major parties is aimed at distributing power between the PLC and FSLN, and preventing other parties from rising. After sealing the agreement in January 2000, the two parties controlled the three key institutions of the state: the Comptroller General of the Republic, the Supreme Court, and the Supreme Electoral Council. "El Pacto," as it is known in Nicaragua, is said to have personally benefited former presidents Ortega and Alemán greatly, while constraining then-president Bolaños. One of the key accords of the pact was to lower the ratio necessary to win a presidential election in the first round from 45% to 35%, a change in electoral law that would become decisive in Ortega's favor in the 2006 elections.

At the Fourth Ordinary Congress of the FSLN, held 17–18 March 2002, Ortega eliminated the National Directorate (DN). Once the main collective leadership body of the party, with nine members, the DN no longer met routinely, and only three historic members remained. Instead, the body just supported decisions already made by the secretary-general. Ortega sidelined party officials and other members while empowering his own informal circle, known as the ring of iron.

2001 presidential election 

In the November 2001 general elections, Ortega lost his third successive presidential election, this time to Enrique Bolaños of the Constitutionalist Liberal Party.

Under Ortega's direction, the FSLN formed the broad National Convergence (Convergencia Nacional) coalition in opposition to the PLC. Ortega abandoned the revolutionary tone of the past, and infused his campaign with religious imagery, giving thanks in speeches to “God and the Revolution” for the post-1990 democracy, and said a Sandinista victory would enable the Nicaraguan people to “pass through the sea and reach the Promised Land.” The US opposed Ortega's candidacy from the beginning. The US ambassador even made an appearance with the PLC's Enrique Bolanos while distributing food aid. The 11 September 2001, terrorist attacks doomed Ortega's chances, as the threat of a US invasion became an issue. Bolanos convinced many Nicaraguans that the renewed US hostility towards terrorism would endanger their country if the openly anti-US Ortega prevailed. Bolanos ended up with 56.3% of the vote, and Ortega won 42.3%.

2006 presidential election

In 2006, Daniel Ortega was elected president with 38% of the vote. This occurred despite the fact that the breakaway Sandinista Renovation Movement (MRS) continued to oppose the FSLN, running former Mayor of Managua, Herty Lewites as its candidate for president. Ortega personally attacked Lewites’ Jewish background, compared him to Judas, and warned he “could end up hanged.” However, Lewites died several months before the elections.

Ortega emphasized peace and reconciliation in his campaign, and selected a former Contra leader, Jaime Morales Corazo, as his running mate. The FSLN also won 38 seats in the congressional elections, becoming the party with the largest representation in parliament. The split in the Constitutionalist Liberal Party helped allow the FSLN to become the largest party in Congress; however, the Sandinista vote had a minuscule split between the FSLN and MRS, and that the liberal party combined is larger than the Frente Faction. In 2010, several liberal congressmen raised accusations about the FSLN presumably attempting to buy votes to pass constitutional reforms that would allow Ortega to run for office for the 6th time since 1984.

Second presidency (2007–present)

According to Tim Rogers, writing in The Atlantic, during his second term as president, Ortega took "full control of all four branches of government, state institutions, the military, and police", and in the process dismantled "Nicaragua’s institutional democracy". Frances Robles wrote that Ortega took control "every aspect of government ... the National Assembly, the Supreme Court, the armed forces, the judiciary, the police and the prosecutor’s office". In its 2019 World Report, Human Rights Watch wrote that Ortega "aggressively dismantled all institutional checks on presidential power".  Many journalists and governments criticize Ortega and label him a dictator.

2008 elections
In June 2008 the Nicaraguan Supreme Court disqualified the MRS and the Conservative Party from participation in municipal elections. In November 2008, the Supreme Electoral Council received national and international criticism following irregularities in municipal elections, but agreed to review results for Managua only, while the opposition demanded a nationwide review. For the first time since 1990, the Council decided not to allow national or international observers to witness the election. Instances of intimidation, violence, and harassment of opposition political party members and NGO representatives have been recorded. Official results show Sandinista candidates winning 94 of the 146 municipal mayoralties, compared to 46 for the main opposition Liberal Constitutional Party (PLC). The opposition claimed that marked ballots were dumped and destroyed, that party members were refused access to some of the vote counts and that tallies from many polling places were altered. As a result of the fraud allegations, the European Union suspended $70m of aid, and the US$64m.

With the late-2000s recession, Ortega in 2011 characterised capitalism as in its "death throes" and portrayed the Bolivarian Alternative for the People of Our America (ALBA) is the most advanced, most Christian and fairest project. He also said God was punishing the United States with the financial crisis for trying to impose its economic principles on poor countries. "It's incredible that in the most powerful country in the world, which spends billions of dollars on brutal wars ... people do not have enough money to stay in their homes."

Before the National Sandinista Council held in September 2009, Lenin Cerna, the secretary of the party organization, called for diversifying its political strategies. He declared the FSLN's future depended on implementing new plans, “so that the party can advance via new routes and in new ways, always under Ortega’s leadership.” Ortega gained power over the selection of candidates, allowing him to personally choose all candidates for public office.

During an interview with David Frost for the Al Jazeera English programme Frost Over The World in March 2009, Ortega suggested that he would like to change the constitution to allow him to run again for president. In Judicial Decision 504, issued on 19 October 2009, the Supreme Court of Justice of Nicaragua declared portions of Articles 147 and 178 of the Constitution of Nicaragua inapplicable; these provisions concerned the eligibility of candidates for president, vice-president, mayor, and vice-mayor—a decision that had the effect of allowing Ortega to run for reelection in 2011.

For this decision, the Sandinista magistrates formed the required quorum by excluding the opposition magistrates and replacing them with Sandinista substitutes, violating the Nicaraguan constitution. Opposing parties, the church and human rights groups in Nicaragua denounced the decision. Throughout 2010, court rulings gave Ortega greater power over judicial and civil service appointments.

While supporting abortion rights during his presidency during the 1980s, Ortega has since embraced the Catholic Church's position of strong opposition.  While non-emergency abortions have long been illegal in Nicaragua, recently even abortions "in the case where the pregnancy endangers the mother's life", otherwise known as therapeutic abortions have been made illegal in the days before the 2006 election, with a six-year prison term in such cases, too—a move supported by Ortega.

2011 election

Ortega was re-elected president with a vote on 6 November and confirmation on 16 November 2011. During the election, the Supreme Electoral Council (CSE) blocked both domestic and international poll observers from multiple polling stations. According to the Supreme Electoral Council, Ortega defeated Fabio Gadea, with 63% of the vote.

2014 amendments
In January 2014 the National Assembly, dominated by the FSLN, approved constitutional amendments that abolished term limits for the presidency and allowed a president to run for an unlimited number of five-year terms. While the FSLN claimed the amendments would assure the stability Nicaragua needed to deal with long-term problems, the opposition claimed they were a threat to democracy. The constitutional reforms also gave Ortega the sole power to appoint military and police commanders.

2016 elections

As of 2016, Ortega's family owns three of the nine free-to-air television channels in Nicaragua, and controls a fourth (the public Channel 6). Four of the remaining five are controlled by Mexican mogul Ángel González, and are generally considered to be aligned with Ortega's ruling FSLN party. There are no government restrictions on Internet use; the Ortega administration attempted to gain complete control over online media in 2015, but failed due to opposition from civil society, political parties, and private organizations.

In June 2016, the Nicaraguan supreme court ruled to oust Eduardo Montealegre, the leader of the main opposition party, leaving the main opposition coalition with no means of contesting the November 2016 national elections. In August 2016, Ortega chose his wife, Rosario Murillo, as his vice-presidential running-mate for re-election.

According to The Washington Post, figures announced on November 7, 2016, put Daniel Ortega in line for his third consecutive term as president, also being his fourth term overall. The Supreme Electoral Council (CSE) reported Ortega and Murillo won 72.4% of the vote, with 68% turnout. The opposition coalition had called the election a "farce" and had called for the boycott of the election. International observers were not allowed to observe the vote. Nevertheless, according to the BBC, Ortega was the most popular candidate by far, possibly due to Nicaragua's stable economic growth and lack of violence compared to its neighbours El Salvador and Honduras in recent years.

Economic situation during presidency
According to Tim Rogers, until the 2018 unrest, as president Ortega presided over "the fastest-growing economy in Central America" and was a "poster child for foreign investment and citizen security in a region known for gangs and unrest". During this time the Ortega government formed an alliance with the Superior Council for Private Enterprise (COSEP), Nicaragua's council of business chambers. However the same unpopular decree which "unilaterally overhauling the social-security tax system" (mentioned below) and precipitated the unrest in April 2018, also broke Ortega's arrangement with COSEP, and along with US sanctions, brought a sharp economic drop that as of mid-2020 is still "crippling" Nicaragua's economy.

Response to COVID pandemic

President Ortega's government has been the target of criticism for its lack of a response to the pandemic.

On 14 March 2020, Ortega's government called a massive demonstration called "Love in the Time of COVID-19" as a show of support to him and his government. This occurred in the middle of the COVID-19 Pandemic which had only recently been officially declared by the WHO.

According to CNN, as of mid-June 2020, Ortega had "refused to impose strict, preventive quarantine measures seen in neighboring countries" to fight the COVID-19 pandemic. "Public schools remain open, businesses continue to operate, festivals and cultural events are happening on an almost-weekly basis." The story stated that from mid-March to mid-June six politicians had died, and, according to witnesses, their remains disposed of at night in "express burials" (with police in attendance but "no Mass, no wake and no funeral arrangements", no photographs). The Ortega government said reports of "express burials" were "false news." According to AP News "the government threatened to ban" professional baseball players "who refuse to play baseball ... And everyone is warned to keep quiet."
In hospitals "ruling-party activists ensure no information leaks out", and it quotes a doctor (anesthesiologist María Nela Escoto) complaining that in the public hospital where she works "everything is secret. They don’t allow suggestions, and you can’t question anything because they’re watching. It’s a very hostile environment.”
(At the start of the pandemic, Ortega was out of the public eye for "more than 40 days", and no explanation was given for his absence when he returned.)

2018–2021 Nicaraguan protests

In April 2018, student protests over a nature reserve fire expanded to cover an unpopular decree that would have cut social security benefits and increased taxpayer contributions. The protesters were violently set upon by the state sponsored Sandinista Youth. Despite attempts by Ortega's government to hide the incident through censorship of all private-owned news outlets, photos and videos of the violence made their way to social media where they sparked outrage and urged more Nicaraguans to join in on the protests. Tensions escalated quickly, as police began using tear gas canisters and rubber bullets, and eventually live ammunition on unarmed protesters. Authorities were also seen arming Sandinista Youth members with weapons to serve as paramilitary forces. Dozens of student protesters were subsequently killed. Despite the withdrawal of the unpopular decree, the protests continue, with most protesters demanding Ortega's and his cabinet's resignations.

On 30 May 2018, Nicaragua's Mother's Day, over 300,000 people marched to honor the mothers of students killed in the preceding protests. Despite the attendance of children, mothers and retirees, and lack of any violence by marchers, marchers were attacked in an event dubbed the "Mother's Day Massacre". 16 were killed, and 88 injured, as "police sprayed the crowd with bullets, government sharpshooters positioned on the roof of the national baseball stadium went headhunting with sniper rifles".

In June 2018, Tim Rogers wrote in The Atlantic magazine:Over the past seven weeks, Ortega’s police and paramilitaries have killed more than 120 people, mostly students and other young protesters who are demanding the president’s ouster and a return to democracy, according to a human-rights group [CENIDH, Nicaraguan Center for Human Rights]. Police hunt students like enemy combatants. Sandinista Youth paramilitaries, armed and paid by Ortega’s party, drive around in pickup trucks attacking protesters. Gangs of masked men loot and burn shops with impunity. Cops wear civilian clothing, and some paramilitaries dress in police uniforms. “This is starting to look more like Syria than Caracas,” one Nicaraguan business leader told me.

By December 322 people were dead and 565 imprisoned. Professionals involved in the protests (lawyers, engineering majors, radio broadcasters and merchants) had been reduced to lives of "ever-changing safe houses, encrypted messaging apps and pseudonyms", with the Ortega government allegedly “hunting us like deer,” according to one dissident (Roberto Carlos Membreño Briceño). Human rights organization offices were raided, computers seized and observers expelled. Observers from the Organization of American States were expelled after releasing a critical investigative report of the government's response to the protests. The report found the government had progressed from "using tear gas to rubber bullets, then real bullets and finally military firepower like assault rifles and grenade launchers", based on an analysis of videos posted on social media. At least 1,400 people involved in the protests were hurt, although that the number was probably "far higher because most people were too afraid to go to public hospitals, where doctors were fired for treating wounded protesters". By July 2019 the international human rights organization Human Rights Watch called on the United States to impose sanctions on Ortega "and other top" Nicaraguan officials "implicated" in the crackdown on protests.

Foreign policy

Ortega's relationship with the United States was never very cordial, as the US had long supported the Somoza family's government. Although the US initially supplied the ruined post-revolution Nicaragua with economic aid, relations quickly soured. His government was beset by violent opposition from US-backed rebels, best known as the Contras.

Soon after the 2006 election, Ortega paid an official visit to Iran and met Iranian President Mahmoud Ahmadinejad. Ortega told the press that the "revolutions of Iran and Nicaragua are almost twin revolutions...since both revolutions are about justice, liberty, self-determination, and the struggle against imperialism."

On 6 March 2008, following the 2008 Andean diplomatic crisis, Ortega announced that Nicaragua was breaking diplomatic ties with Colombia "in solidarity with the Ecuadorian people". Ortega also stated, "We are not breaking relations with the Colombian people. We are breaking relations with the terrorist policy practiced by Álvaro Uribe's government". The relations were restored with the resolution at a Rio Group summit held in Santo Domingo, Dominican Republic, on 7 March 2008. At the summit Colombia's Álvaro Uribe, Ecuador's Rafael Correa, Venezuela's Hugo Chávez and Ortega publicly shook hands in a show of good-will. The handshakes, broadcast live throughout Latin America, appeared to signal that a week of military buildups and diplomatic repercussions was over. After the handshakes, Ortega said he would re-establish diplomatic ties with Colombia. Uribe then quipped that he would send him the bill for his ambassador's plane fare.

On 25 May 2008, Ortega, upon learning of the death of FARC guerrilla leader Manuel Marulanda in Colombia, expressed condolences to the family of Marulanda and solidarity with the FARC and called Marulanda an extraordinary fighter who battled against profound inequalities in Colombia. The declarations were protested by the Colombian government and criticized in the major Colombian media outlets.

On 2 September 2008, during ceremonies for the 29th anniversary of the founding of the Nicaraguan army, Ortega announced that "Nicaragua recognizes the independence of South Ossetia and Abkhazia and fully supports the Russian government's position". Ortega's decision made Nicaragua the second country (after Russia) to recognize the independence of Abkhazia and South Ossetia from Georgia.

When seeking office, Ortega threatened to cut diplomatic recognition with the Republic of China (Taiwan, formerly Nationalist China) in order to restore relations with the Mainland-based People's Republic of China (as in the period from 1985 to 1990) as the legal government of China. But he did not do so. In 2007 Ortega stated that Nicaragua did not accept the One China Policy of the PRC government and that Nicaragua reserved the right to maintain official diplomatic relations with the ROC. He reassured President Chen Shui Bian in 2007 that Nicaragua would not break diplomatic relations with the ROC. He explained that during the Reagan administration the United States imposed sanctions on Nicaragua. But cutting ties with Taipei was a sad and painful decision because of the friendship between Nicaragua and Taiwan's people and government. Ortega met with the ROC President Ma Ying-jeou in 2009 and both agreed to improve the diplomatic ties between both countries. However, with a trade show from China (PRC) in Managua in 2010, he is attempting a two-track policy to get benefits from both sides. In 2016 Nicaragua and China (ROC) signed an air services agreement and Ortega stated that Nicaragua's free trade deal with the ROC had benefited both nations. The ROC increased its investment in Nicaragua. In December 2021, Nicaragua once again switched recognition with the PRC.

In September 2010, after a US report listed Nicaragua as a "major" drug-trafficking centre, with Costa Rica and Honduras, Ortega urged the US Congress and Obama administration to allocate more resources to assist the fight against drug trafficking.

During the Libyan Civil War, Ortega was among the very few leaders who spoke out in clear defense of the embattled Muammar Gaddafi. During a telephone conversation between the two, Ortega told Gaddafi that he was "waging a great battle to defend his nation" and stated that "it's at difficult times that loyalty and resolve are put to the test."

Ortega has said that Assad's victory in the 2014 election is an important step to "attain peace in Syria and a clear cut evidence that the Syrian people trust their president as a national leader and support his policies which aim at maintaining Syria's sovereignty and unity".

Ortega attended the swearing-in ceremony of Nicolás Maduro for his second term on 10 January 2019.

In an interview with Max Blumenthal in August 2019, Ortega stated that he was open to the idea of Bernie Sanders (who had visited him in 1985) winning the US presidency in 2020 and that Bernie's message "goes in the right direction for the U.S. to become a pole of peace, development, and cooperation."

Environmental policy
In 2016, Daniel Ortega did not sign the Paris Agreement because he felt the deal did not do enough to protect the climate, although he later changed his mind. Moreover, Nicaragua rejected projects of mining of the Canadian group B2 Gold which could represent a threat to the environment. According to government estimates, Nicaragua has passed from 25% renewable electricity to 52% between 2007 and 2016.

US sanctions
In November 2021, Joe Biden signed into law the "Reinforcing Nicaragua’s Adherence to Conditions for Electoral Reform Act" (RENACER Act) which extended US sanctions against Nicaragua and gave Biden the power to exclude Nicaragua from the Dominican Republic-Central America Free Trade Agreement (CAFTA-DR) and to obstruct multilateral loans to Nicaragua. Venezuela and Russia condemned the new law.

Electoral history

1984 general election

1990 general election

1996 general election

2001 general election

2006 general election

2011 general election

2016 general election

2021 general election

Controversy
Ortega's presidency has been subject to much criticism and accusations of his becoming a strongman. The 2018 protests have been pointed to as being symbolic of these tensions. In 2018, Frances Robles wrote in The New York Times that the "many Ortega adult children manage everything from gasoline distribution to television stations" in Nicaragua.

In the months preceding the November 2021 Nicaraguan general election, Ortega's government arrested many prominent opposition members. As of July 23, 26 opposition leaders have been imprisoned.

On March 24, 2022, the ambassador Arturo McFields, condemned the Ortega government and requested the release of political prisoners, alluding that the government people were "tired of dictatorship" and that it was not easy to denounce it. As a result, he was dismissed.

The American lawyer Paul Reichler also left his position as representative due to "moral conscience", who felt that "He was no longer the Daniel Ortega whom he respected so much and served with so much pride," he found it inconceivable that someone like him would have mercilessly suppressed peaceful demonstrations and who denounced that he had his former colleagues prisoners in inhumane conditions, accusing him of "murdering" said general for not receiving adequate medical treatment. This figure of American origin served as Nicaragua's international legal adviser before the International Court of Justice, when Managua denounced the United States for financing the counterrevolution, winning the case.

The Ortega administration also ordered the closure of the Nicaraguan Language Academy for failing to register as a "foreign agent" ratified by the Sandinista parliament with the favorable vote of 75 deputies of the ruling FSLN.

Sexual abuse allegations
In 1998, Daniel Ortega's adopted stepdaughter Zoilamérica Narváez released a 48-page report in which she alleged he had sexually abused her from 1979, when she was 12, until 1990. Ortega and his wife Murillo denied the allegation. The case could not proceed in Nicaraguan courts, which have been consistently allied with Ortega, because he had immunity from prosecution as a member of parliament, and the five-year statute of limitations for sexual abuse and rape charges had expired. Narváez's complaint to the Inter American Human Rights Commission was ruled admissible on 15 October 2001. On 4 March 2002, the Nicaraguan government accepted the commission's recommendation of a "friendly agreement". Narváez withdrew the accusations in 2008. Following the 2016 election, Narváez renewed her accusations and said that she had become an outcast in her family.

In 2019 a documentary film Exiliada was released which revolves around Zoilamérica Narváez and her sexual abuse allegations against Ortega.

There is also the case of Elvia Junieth who was abused by the president in 2005, and, according to the family, a girl was born from that relationship that Ortega did not recognize. Ernesto Moncada Lau, another of the assistants to the Sandinista president, appears on the birth certificate as the father of the minor. Her brother died in the Tipitapa Model prison in November 2021.

Foreign honours

 
  Order of Honor and Glory, First Class
 
  Order of José Martí
 
  Order of Sukhbaatar
 
  Order of the Sun of Peru
 
  Order of Friendship
 
  Uatsamonga Order

References

Citations

Sources 

 
 
 , especially:

External links

 Office of the President 
 Biography by CIDOB 

1945 births
Anti-Americanism
Anti-capitalists
Anti-Catholicism
Anti-fascists
Central American University (Managua) alumni
Living people
Nicaraguan communists
Nicaraguan Marxists
Nicaraguan nationalists
Nicaraguan prisoners and detainees
Nicaraguan revolutionaries
Nicaraguan socialists
Nicaraguan torture victims
Nicaraguan male writers
People from Chontales Department
People of the Nicaraguan Revolution
Persecution of Catholics
Presidents of Nicaragua
Sandinista National Liberation Front politicians